Massachusetts increased 3 seats to 17 in reapportionment after the 1800 census.

See also 
 United States House of Representatives elections, 1802 and 1803
 List of United States representatives from Massachusetts

Notes 

United States House of Representatives elections in Massachusetts
United States House of Representatives
Massachusetts
United States House of Representatives